Sgurr Dhòmhnuill or Sgurr Dhòmhnaill is a mountain in western Scotland.

Marilyns of Scotland
Corbetts
Mountains and hills of the Northwest Highlands